Actwres girl'Z, is a Japanese independent women's professional wrestling promotion founded in 2015. The meaning of the "Actwres girl'Z" name is a combination of the words "wrestler" and "actress".

History
Actwres girl'Z was founded in 2015 under a similar concept to JDStar's "Athress" . The promotion's roster is currently made up mostly of Japanese idols and former Stardom wrestlers as well as other members of the entertainment industry. The promotion's first show was held on May 31, 2015, at Shin-Kiba 1st Ring. On August 7, 2016, former All Japan Women's Pro-Wrestling star Yumiko Hotta was appointed as an advisor. In 2018, the promotion worked together with Hello Kitty and ran a show at the Japanese Hello Kitty themed amusement park, Sanrio Puroland. 2018 continued to be a landmark year for the promotion as they had their first ever show at Korakuen Hall. The promotion initially only ran a few events per year, but grew to having multiple events per month with a record of 32 events in 2018. The group while initially only running in Tokyo, Japan has since held events in Osaka, Nagoya and Saitama.

In 2019, the company officially split into two brands, Beginning and Color's. Beginning was a more traditional wrestling brand with more experienced wrestlers, while Color's featured more rookie wrestlers. This signified a shift and acted as a bit of a soft reboot for Actwres girl'Z.

As of May 2020, Actwres girl’Z have launched their own VOD service available on tablet, smartphone, or computer.

In 2020, Actwres girl'Z launched Action Ring Girl'Z, a "pro wrestling action fantasy". The project is more entertainment focused, and features factions of space pirates, samurai, and magical girls in search of three sacred treasures.

In November 2021, Actwres girl'Z announced the dissolution of their Color's and Beginning brands, in favor of a more entertainment-based product. On February 13, 2022, the company ran their first ACTwrestling show under their new format.

Roster

Actwres girl'Z

Action Ring Girl'Z

Kaguya

Sheloll

Sky-Rex

Hagakure

Star magical☆project

Bijou

gem

taofasyue

Alumni

Championships 

Active

Defunct

AWG Color's Championship

The AWG Color's Championship is a midcard championship initially created and promoted by the Japanese promotion Actwres girl'Z. After the dissolution of the Color's brand in AWG, the championship began being sanctioned by the newly created Color's promotion which started its activity in early 2022. The title has never been considered deactivated. There have been a total of five reigns shared between four different champions. The current holder is Rina Amikura who is in her first reign.

Combined reigns

AWG Tag Team Championship

The AWG Tag Team Championship was a tag team championship created and promoted by the Japanese promotion Actwres girl'Z. There have been a total of two reigns shared between two different teams consisting of four distinctive champions.

External links

References

Japanese women's professional wrestling promotions
Sports organizations established in 2015
2015 establishments in Japan